Shadipur is a village in Sanghol.   It falls under Khamono tehsil in Fatehgarh Sahib District of Indian state of Punjab.

About 
Shadipur is almost 6 km from Sanghol.  The nearest Railway station to Shadipur is Nogawan Railway station. The village is famous for NIRMAL-A-SANT GURCHARAN SINGH.

Post code and STD code 

Shadipur's Post code and STD code are 141128 & 0160 respectively.

References

Villages in Fatehgarh Sahib district